The Constitution of Venezuela of 1874 (Official name: Constitution of the United States of Venezuela. Spanish: Constitución de los Estados Unidos de Venezuela) was a constitution sanctioned on June 16, 1874, by a Congress dominated by Antonio Guzmán Blanco. It was similar to the previous constitution, with few modifications, such as: it obliged voters to sign the ballot, abolished the Appointees, reduced the constitutional period to 3 years, prohibited presidential reelection.

Characteristics 

 The elections lose the character of secret ballot due to the fact that the constitution obliges to sign the ballot.
 The presidential term is reduced from 5 to 3 years.
 Presidential reelection is prohibited.
 The term of office of the members of the Federal High Court is reduced to 2 years.

See also 

 April Revolution (Venezuela)

References 

Constitutions of Venezuela 
1874 in Venezuela 
1874 in law 
1874 in politics